Olivia Sophie Margaret Rae (born 14 April 1988) is a Scottish cricketer who plays primarily as a right-handed batter. She played for the Scotland women's national cricket team between 2010 and 2017, including playing in the 2017 Women's Cricket World Cup Qualifier in February 2017. She has played domestic cricket for Durham, Berkshire, Middlesex and Canterbury.

References

External links
 
 

1988 births
Living people
Sportspeople from Durham, England
Cricketers from County Durham
Scottish women cricketers
Durham women cricketers
Berkshire women cricketers
Middlesex women cricketers
Canterbury Magicians cricketers